Yasheng Huang is an American professor in international management at the MIT Sloan School of Management, where he founded and heads the China Lab and India Lab. His research areas include human capital formation in China and India.

He had previous appointments at the University of Michigan and Harvard Business School.

Huang is the author of Capitalism with Chinese Characteristics, a history of economic reforms in China.

Early life and education
Dr. Huang was born in Beijing, China. He moved to the United States to pursue his higher education, and enrolled for a B.A. degree program, with a major in government from Harvard College, which he completed in 1985. Upon completion, he went on to earn a Ph.D. in government from John F. Kennedy School of Government at Harvard University in 1991.

Career
While he was preparing for his Ph.D, he worked as a World Bank consultant and associate professor at the University of Michigan from 1987 to 1989. In 1997, he joined Harvard Business School as the Associate Professor in business, government and international economics.

He is currently a professor in international management at the MIT Sloan School of Management, joined in 2003. At MIT, he founded and heads the China Lab and India Lab. His research areas include human capital formation in China and India.

Bibliography
Dr. Huang’s scholarly work and articles have been published in a number of economics and management journals, and publications including TheWall Street Journal, The Economist, and Businessworld. He also authored / co authored books on topics – globalization and emerging markets; FDI, Investment strategies, financial liberalization in China. A selection of his books and articles, are the following:

 Books (author)
 
 
 
 
 

 Articles
 Yasheng Huang, Tarun Khanna (July 2003); Can India Overtake China?; Foreign policy
 Yasheng Huang (July/August 2008); The Next Asian Miracle; Foreign Policy magazine;
 Yasheng Huang (December 2008); The China Growth Fantasy; Wall Street Journal;
 Yasheng Huang (January 2011); Rethinking the Beijing Consensus; Asia Policy;

Personal life

References

External links 
 
 
 "Does democracy stifle economic growth?" (TEDGlobal 2011)

Business educators
Chinese business theorists
Chinese emigrants to the United States
Harvard Business School alumni
Harvard Business School faculty
MIT Sloan School of Management faculty
University of Michigan faculty
Living people
Place of birth missing (living people)
Year of birth missing (living people)
Economists from Beijing
Writers from Beijing
Educators from Beijing